Piotr Jan Nurowski (20 June 1945 – 10 April 2010) was a Polish tennis player and the chief of the Polish Olympic Committee.

Nurowski was born in Sandomierz. He died in Smolensk, Russia in the 2010 Polish Air Force Tu-154 crash.

On 16 April 2010 he was posthumously awarded the Commander's Cross of the Order of Polonia Restituta. He was buried in the Alley of the Meritorious in the  Military Cemetery in Warsaw.

Functions
 1973–1980: President of Polish Athletics Federation
Vice President of Children and Youth Sports Association
Member of the Polish Athletics Development Foundation
 Since 2005: President Polish Olympic Committee

References

1945 births
2010 deaths
Polish referees and umpires
Burials at Powązki Military Cemetery
Diplomats of the Polish People's Republic
Polish United Workers' Party members
People from Sandomierz County
Victims of the Smolensk air disaster
University of Warsaw alumni
Commanders of the Order of Polonia Restituta
Sportspeople from Świętokrzyskie Voivodeship